Enigmofusus nicki is a species of sea snail, a marine gastropod mollusk in the family Fasciolariidae, the spindle snails, the tulip snails and their allies.

Description

Distribution
This marine species occurs off Mozambique.

References

 Snyder M.A. (2002). Fusinus nicki, a new fasciolariid gastropod from Mozambique. Journal of Conchology. 37(5): 441-444
 Vermeij G.J. & Snyder M.A. (2018). Proposed genus-level classification of large species of Fusininae (Gastropoda, Fasciolariidae). Basteria. 82(4-6): 57-82

nicki
Gastropods described in 2002